Moti Laxmi Upasika (30 June 1909 – 1997) was Nepal's first woman poet and short story writer of modern times. Her first work, a short story, was published in 1935.

Early life

Moti Laxmi Upasika (also spelled Motilakshmī Upāsikā) was born in Kathmandu to father Drabya Dhar and mother Gyan Laxmi Tuladhar. Her father was a merchant who owned a business house in Lhasa, Tibet. Her brother was poet Chittadhar Hridaya. She received informal education in Sanskrit, Pali and English.

Writing career

Upasika, who also wrote under the pen name M. Laxmi, published her first work in 1935, a story in the Nepali language entitled Rodan. It appeared in Sharada magazine published from Kathmandu.

She started writing in Nepal Bhasa with a poem entitled Chitta Panchhi (meaning "Heart bird") and a story Lan ("Road") which were published in Dharmadoot in 1944. Dharmadoot was a Buddhist magazine published in Hindi by the Maha Bodhi Society from Sarnath, India. It also published contributions in Nepal Bhasa at the request of its subscribers in Nepal.

Though most of her essays deal with religious subjects, her writings have been described as a bridge between religious and free prose. Her essays are characterized by simple language and a powerful way of expressing her opinions.

Published works

 Motima ("Garland of Pearls"), a collection of essays, 1958
 Chakhunchiya Sarbay ("Sparrow's Property"), a collection of poems, 1993
 Moti Bakhan Puchah ("Moti Collection of Stories"), a collection of short stories, 1994
 Utpalvarna, a collection of Buddhist stories, 1995
 Dhaubaji ("Yogurt and Rice Flakes"), a collection of essays, 1998

References

1909 births
1997 deaths
People from Kathmandu
Newar people
Newar-language writers
20th-century women writers
Nepalese women short story writers
Nepalese short story writers
Nepal Bhasa movement
Nepalese women poets
20th-century Nepalese poets
20th-century short story writers
20th-century Nepalese women writers
Newar-language poets from Nepal